Two-time defending champion Rafael Nadal defeated Roger Federer in the final, 6–3, 4–6, 6–3, 6–4 to win the men's singles tennis title at the 2007 French Open. It was his third French Open title and his third major title overall.

For the second consecutive year, Federer was attempting to complete the career Grand Slam and to become the first man since Rod Laver in 1969 to hold all four major titles at once, having won the preceding Wimbledon, US Open, and Australian Open. It was the second of three consecutive years Nadal and Federer would contest the French Open final, and the third of four consecutive years they would meet at the event (including their 2005 semifinal encounter). Novak Djokovic, who would go on to hold all four major titles at once at the 2016 French Open, reached his first major semifinal at this event.

Federer made a record-breaking eighth consecutive major final appearance (streak starting at the 2005 Wimbledon Championships), surpassing Jack Crawford's record of seven consecutive finals, reached between 1933 and 1934.

Seeds

Qualifying draw

Draw

Finals

Top half

Section 1

Section 2

Section 3

Section 4

Bottom half

Section 5

Section 6

Section 7

Section 8

External links
Official Roland Garros 2007 Men's Singles Draw
Qualifying Draw
2007 French Open – Men's draws and results at the International Tennis Federation

Men's Singles
2007